The New Seldom Scene Album is an album by the progressive bluegrass Maryland band The Seldom Scene.

Track listing 
 "Big Rig" (Greg "Fingers" Taylor) 03:44
 "If That's the Way You Feel" (Carter Stanley, Ralph Stanley) 02:59
 "Easy Ride from Good Times to the Blues" (Herb Pedersen) 03:05
 "Paradise Valley" (Traditional; arranged by Tom Gray) 03:19
 "California Earthquake" (Rodney Crowell) 05:22
 "Railroad Man" (Traditional;arranged by John Starling) 03:16
 "Answer Your Call" (John Starling) 03:59
 "I Haven't Got the Right to Love You" (Sam Buchanan, Vernon Claud) 02:38
 "Song for the Life" (Rodney Crowell) 03:32
 "Rebels Ye Rest" (Pauline Beauchamp) 02:34
 "Pictures from Life's Other Side" (Traditional; arranged by John Duffey) 04:15

Personnel 
The Seldom Scene
 John Starling - vocals, guitar
 John Duffey - mandolin, vocals
 Ben Eldridge - banjo, lead guitar, vocals
 Mike Auldridge - Dobro, guitar, pedal steel guitar, vocals
 Tom Gray - bass, vocals
with:
Linda Ronstadt - harmony vocals on "California Earthquake"
Mark Cuff - drums, percussion

References

External links 
 Official site

1976 albums
The Seldom Scene albums
Rebel Records albums